Ratu Epeli Kanakana (died 2010) was a Fijian chief. He held the title of Tui Suva, and was the traditional ruler of the area that includes the city of Suva, the nation's capital. The title of Tui Suva is only kept within the Naivutuvutu family of the Tokatoka Solia of Mataqali Vuanimocelolo of the Yavusa Vatuwaqa.

References

Fijian chiefs
People from Suva
Year of birth missing
2010 deaths